Inkabi Nation is a studio album by South African artists Big Zulu, Xowla, Siya Ntuli, Mduduzi Ncube and Lwah Ndlunkulu, released on September 9, 2022 through Nkabi Records.

Background 
In early September 2022, Big Zulu announced the album's release date and final track listing on Instagram.

Track listing

Release and singles 
"Voicemail" by Big Zulu, Mduduzi Ncube, Lwah Ndlunkulu, Siya Ntuli and Xowla was released as the album's lead single on June 24, 2022. The song peaked at number one on Apple Music in South Africa.

The standard edition of the album was released on September 9, 2022.

References 

2022 albums